Christa Calamas is a Florida lawyer. She was the former Secretary of the Florida Agency for Health Care Administration (ACHA).  She was appointed by Jeb Bush. She also served as Assistant General Counsel to Governor Bush, she also served as the Assistant General Counsel at AHCA. Calamas currently serves as the Staff Director for the Florida House of Representatives' Health and Human Services Committee.

Calamas received her bachelor's degree from Eckerd College, her master's degree from the University of Dundee, and her Juris Doctor from the University of Florida.

References

Alumni of the University of Dundee
Florida Republicans
Eckerd College alumni
University of Florida alumni
Living people
Year of birth missing (living people)